= MarkLives =

South Africa-based online publication

MarkLives.com
- Website type: Industry news / trade media (marketing, media, advertising)
- Available in: English
- Owner: MarkLives (Pty) Ltd
- Creator: Herman Manson (founder / editor)
- Website: Marklives.com
- Launched: August 2008 (as blog) / 2012 (relaunch as news platform)
- Current status: Active

MarkLives is a South Africa-based online publication covering marketing, advertising, media and communications. It provides industry news, opinion, agency rankings and trend analysis for media and marketing professionals.

MarkLives evolved from media.toolbox, a digital advertising and media trade publication launched by journalist Herman Manson in 1998 and has evolved from a personal blog into a respected industry news platform. The 'Mark' is for 'Market'.

It is known for its annual Agency Leaders Survey, which polls local industry executives on the peers and rivals they most admire. In 2025, MarkLives launched The Mark Awards, a premier industry awards show celebrating innovation, excellence and creativity across the marketing ecosystem.
